The Palmetto Beach Historic District is an historic district in Tampa, Florida. It is just south of Ybor City. The neighborhood was platted in 1894.  Four cigar factories were built there, the first in 1895. The district was added to the National Register of Historic Places on August 14, 2012.

References

Buildings and structures in Hillsborough County, Florida
Historic districts on the National Register of Historic Places in Florida
National Register of Historic Places in Tampa, Florida